Hurshid Ahmed Pasha (sometimes written Khurshid Ahmad Pasha; , ; died 30 November 1822) was an Ottoman-Georgian general, and Grand Vizier during the early 19th century.

Early life
He was born in the Caucasus and was of Georgian descent. He was kidnapped and taken to Constantinople as a youth, converted to Islam and enrolled in the Janissaries. There he acquired the favour of Sultan Mahmud II and occupied several high positions.

Egypt (1801–05)
Appointed mayor of Alexandria after the French evacuated Egypt in 1801, he was named governor of Egypt in 1804 at Muhammad Ali's behest. Allied with Britain's diplomatic representative, Hurshid tried to get Muhammad Ali and his Albanians removed from Egypt, bringing in the deli (lit. "madmen") light cavalry from Ottoman Syria to counterbalance them. Muhammad Ali won the Delis to his side and, backed by a demonstration of ulema and guild leaders in Cairo, had himself named governor of Egypt in May 1805. Hurshid, abandoned by his troops, was besieged in the Cairo Citadel, which he left only after he saw the Ottoman firman investing Muhammad Ali as Egypt's governor.

Rumelia
In 1808, Hurshid Pasha served as the governor of Rumelia.

Suppression of the Serbian Revolution
 

In March 1809, he was sent to Serbia (the Sanjak of Smederevo) to repress the First Serbian Uprising led by Karađorđe Petrović. On 5 September 1812 he was named Grand Vizier (Prime Minister), a post he held until 1 April 1815. He remained on campaign in Serbia as commander-in-chief (serasker), and brought the uprising to an end after recapturing Belgrade in October 1813. In that year he was named governor of the Eyalet of Bosnia and from that position he campaigned with success against the Second Serbian Uprising led by Miloš Obrenović.

Suppression of Ali Pasha's revolt and Greek Revolution
In November 1820, he was named mora valisi, governor of the Morea Eyalet (the Peloponnese), with seat at Tripoli and serasker of the expedition against the rebellious Ali Pasha of Yanina. Before he left for Yanina, however, he was disturbed by rumours of a possible revolt among the Greeks of the Morea. His fears were allayed, however, when an assembly of Greek notables visited him on 8 November 1820 in Tripoli. Thus, on 6 January 1821, he left Tripoli for the north, leaving behind his treasury and his harem, while his deputy (kaimakam) Mehmed Salih with a force of 1,000 Albanians remained to maintain order. However, only a few months later, while the Ottoman armies were besieging Yanina, the first uprisings of the Greek War of Independence took place. 

Hurshid immediately informed the Sultan of the events, and without waiting for instructions, reacted by sending Omer Vryonis and Köse Mehmed Pasha to suppress the revolt first in Central Greece and then to cross over to the Peloponnese and quell the uprising in its heartland. At the same time, he dispatched his chief of staff Mustafa Bey with 3,000 men to reinforce the garrison of Tripoli. Hurshid himself remained in Yanina to supervise the last stages of the siege. Despite his rapid reaction, his plans ultimately failed: Vryonis and Köse Mehmed failed to suppress the revolt in Central Greece, while the reinforcements of Mustafa Bey were insufficient to save Tripoli, which fell to the Greeks under Theodoros Kolokotronis after a prolonged siege, on 23 September 1821. Despite the general massacre of the Muslim inhabitants, Hurshid's harem and a part of his treasure were saved. Finally, in January 1822, he killed Ali Pasha through treason, and sent his severed head to the Sultan, and his star seemed on the rise again. He assembled an army of 80,000 men (a huge number by Balkan standards) and was about to march in order to finally crush the Greek uprising, when disaster struck. His political enemies in Constantinople, alarmed at the fame and power he had achieved and the prestige that the successful ending of both Ali Pasha's and the Greek revolts would bring him, accused him of misappropriating a large part of Ali's treasure. Hurshid had sent 40,000,000 piasters, with a statement that they had been found in Ali's vaults, while the Sultan's ministers calculated Ali's fortune at over 500,000,000 piasters. When they asked him to send a detailed account, the offended Hurshid did not reply. Shortly after that, he was denounced for abuse of public treasure and fell in disgrace. He was removed from his positions, and replaced as serasker and mora valisi by Mahmud Dramali Pasha. Hurshid was ordered to remain in Larissa to attend to the provisioning of Dramali's army.

When news began arriving in Constantinople of the failure of Dramali's expedition at Dervenakia, the Sultan ordered Hurshid to take matters in his own hand and salvage what he could of the situation. However, his opponents continued to plot against him, and agents were sent to kill him. Although he was informed of the threat to his person, Hurshid did not react. Instead, he ordered the post-haste construction of a very tomb, and arranged for a very elaborate funeral with all authorities present, without telling anyone who these arrangements were made for. Then he called all authorities, attended his own funeral, and upon completion of the ceremony he committed suicide by taking poison in front of everyone, on 30 November 1822. Despite the public nature of his death, the Sultan's emissaries still had to exhume him and take his head to the Sultan, as these were their orders

See also
Muhammad Ali's seizure of power
List of Ottoman governors of Egypt

References

Sources

18th-century births
1822 deaths
19th-century Grand Viziers of the Ottoman Empire
19th-century Ottoman governors of Egypt
Converts to Islam
Pashas
Suicides by poison
Suicides in the Ottoman Empire
Georgians from the Ottoman Empire
Ottoman military personnel of the Greek War of Independence
Ottoman governors of Egypt
Ottoman military personnel of the Serbian Revolution
Ottoman governors of Bosnia